DXRV-TV (channel 11) is a television station in Iligan City, Philippines, airing programming from the GMA network. Owned and operated by the network's namesake corporate parent, the station maintains a transmitting facility atop Circumferencial Road, Brgy. Del Carmen, Iligan City.

The station had started to reach broadcast from Kitanglad Mountain Range, Bukidnon Province in 1980s until it was weak in 2010s, when GMA Cagayan de Oro launched a relay station via Channel 35.

GMA TV-11 Iligan current programs
 One Mindanao (simulcast on TV-5 Davao)
 At Home with GMA Regional TV (simulcast on TV-5 Davao)

See also
DXJC-TV
DXMJ-TV
List of GMA Network stations

Television stations in Iligan
Television channels and stations established in 1977
GMA Network stations